Kristin S. Boggs is an American politician serving as the state representative for the 18th District of the Ohio House of Representatives. She is a Democrat. The district includes portions of Columbus including the German Village, Italian Village, Victorian Village, the Short North, Franklinton, Downtown Columbus and Ohio State University, as well as Bexley and Grandview Heights in Franklin County.

Life and career
Boggs was born in Ashtabula and raised in Jefferson, and is the daughter of Robert Boggs, a former member of the Ohio House of Representatives, Democratic Leader in the Ohio Senate, as well as a former Director of the Ohio Department of Agriculture. She attended Kent State University before joining the Americorps.

Following her time with the Americorps, Boggs attended the Cleveland Marshall College of Law, and subsequently worked as an Ohio Assistant Attorney General for nearly ten years. She focused on a number of issues, including predatory lending and fair wages for workers.

She is a resident of the Italian Village in Columbus.

Ohio House of Representatives
In 2015, Representative Michael Stinziano won election to the Columbus City Council and resigned from his seat. The Ohio Democratic House Caucus chose Boggs from a number of candidates to replace him, and she was appointed to finish out his term on January 26, 2016.

Boggs was elected to her first term in November 2016. She defeated Republican and Green Party opponents by obtaining more than 66% of the vote.

References

External links
Ohio State Representative Kristin Boggs official site

|-

21st-century American politicians
21st-century American women politicians
American women lawyers
Cleveland–Marshall College of Law alumni
Kent State University alumni
Living people
Democratic Party members of the Ohio House of Representatives
Ohio lawyers
People from Ashtabula, Ohio
Women state legislators in Ohio
Year of birth missing (living people)